Wanduradeniya is a village located in Galigamuwa A.G.A Division in Kegalle District, Sri Lanka.

Geography
Wanduradeniya is located between Atugoda and Harigala.Atugoda from North and Harigala from South. Kadugamuwa is located West. Average altitude of 180 meters above mean sea level. Atugoda Ela is the closest water resource of the Village.

Civic Administration
68-B Renapana Grama Niladhari division administrate this area.

Demographics
Only Sinhalese peoples in the village and they believe in Buddhism. Wanduradeniya Bo-Maluwa is the only Temple in village

Education
Wanduradeniya Primary School is the only school in this village. It was started in 1950s as a secondary school. But now it is a primary school with about 40 students.

Places of interest

Galgediyana Falls

Wanduradeniya Bo-Maluwa

Transport
You can manage transport service by bus.
Distance from Kegalle 12 km
Distance from Avissawella - Kegalle Highway 5 km
Distance from Bulathkohupitiya - Kegalle Highway 5 km

See also 
Kegalle
Sabaragamuwa
Galigamuwa

References

Populated places in Sabaragamuwa Province